The RiverJazz Festival is a jazz music festival started by ArtsQuest in 2011. The festival has been held each year at SteelStacks in Bethlehem, Pennsylvania. SteelStacks is a dynamic arts, culture and education campus that was constructed on 4.5 acres of the former Bethlehem Steel Corporation. 

The event showcases local and national jazz and swing artists over the course of several days, typically sometime in April, May, or June. Attendees are welcome to attend the many free shows around the festival, or purchase tickets to see national headlining acts, where they are also offered meal options.

2016 Lineup

Yuengling Musikfest Cafe Stage at the ArtsQuest Center
 Pat Metheny & Ron Carter
 Craig Thatcher Band
 Charter Arts Big Band
 Kamasi Washington
 North Penn Navy Jazz Band
 Jessy J
 Brian Dunne
 Delbert McClinton

TD Community Stage on the Capital BlueCross Creativity Commons
 Mike Lorenz Trio
 Blackbird Society Orchestra
 Korey Riker Trio
 Craig Kastelnik & Friends

2015 Lineup

Yuengling Musikfest Cafe Performers
  Dr. John & The Nite Trippers
 Dave Liebman
 Spyro Gyra
 Laura Dubin Trio
 Dan Wilkins Trio
 Blackbird Society Orchestra
 Eric Mintel Trio

Frank Banko Alehouse Cinema Jazz on Film Movie Series
 The Glenn Miller Story
  Lady Sings the Blues
  Young Man with a Horn
 Mo' Better Blues

2014 Lineup
 Preservation Hall Jazz Band
 Pat Martino
 Cherry Poppin' Daddies
 Jane Monheit
 Terence Blanchard
 Jessy Carolina & The Hot Mess
 Miss Tess & The Talkbacks
 Gas House Gorillas
 Perseverance Jazz Band
 Smooth Operators
 Craig Kastelnik & Friends

2013 Lineup
 Chick Corea
 The Fabulous Thunderbirds
 Preservation Hall Jazz Band
 Quakertown High School Jazz Band
 Big Bad Voodoo Daddy
 Cook Trio
 The Girls: A Tribute to Mom
 Dan DeChellis
 Jason Miles

2012 Lineup
 Walter Trout & The Radicals
 Preservation Hall Jazz Band
 Béla Fleck
 The Marcus Roberts Trio
 Kevin Eubanks
 Lynnie Godfrey
 Eric Mintel Quartet

2011 Lineup
 Spyro Gyra
 Preservation Hall Jazz Band
 The Clayton Brothers
 Craig Kastelnik & Friends
 Bitches Brew Revisited
 Dan DeChellis
 Eric Mintel Quartet
 Central Park Stompers
 June Thomas
 Woody Browns Project
 Audio Dynamikz

References

Music festivals in Pennsylvania
Jazz festivals in the United States
Tourist attractions in Northampton County, Pennsylvania
Bethlehem, Pennsylvania
2011 establishments in Pennsylvania
Music festivals established in 2011